Gamal Belal Salem (born Kipkemoi Katui on 12 September 1978 in Eldoret, Kenya) is a Qatari runner who specializes in the 3000 metres steeplechase, training with the world record holder Saif Saaeed Shaheen under the Italian coach Renato Canova.

He has represented Qatar at the IAAF World Cross Country Championships on numerous occasions, including two team bronze medals at the 2005 competition and one at the 2008 competition. He won the 10,000 metres at the 2005 West Asian Games, and was also the 5000 metres silver medallist. He was also the silver medallist in the steeplechase at the 2006 Asian Games, where he finished behind fellow Kenyan-turned-Qatari Tareq Mubarak Taher. He won the World Military Cross Country Championships that same year.

From 2009 onwards, he decided to run road races, leaving the activity on track. He made his debut over the marathon distance at La Route Du Louvre in May 2010 and won in a time of 2:12:46 hours. He ran at the Amatrice-Configno road race in Italy in August 2010 and took second place behind former compatriot and steeplechase specialist Ezekiel Kemboi. He entered the marathon race at the 2010 Asian Games, but did not manage finish the race.

Salem improved his marathon best to 2:12:27 hours at the 2011 Madrid Marathon and was fourth overall.

Achievements

Personal bests
3000 metres – 7:30.76 min (2005)
3000 metres steeplechase – 8:11.67 min (2005)
5000 metres – 13:06.81 min (2006)
10,000 metres - 27:51.52 min (2008)
Marathon - 2:12:27 (2011)

References

1978 births
Living people
Kenyan male long-distance runners
Kenyan male marathon runners
Qatari male long-distance runners
Qatari male marathon runners
People from Uasin Gishu County
Asian Games medalists in athletics (track and field)
Kenyan emigrants to Qatar
Naturalised citizens of Qatar
Athletes (track and field) at the 2006 Asian Games
Athletes (track and field) at the 2010 Asian Games
Qatari people of Kenyan descent
Qatari male steeplechase runners
Asian Games silver medalists for Qatar
Medalists at the 2006 Asian Games